The following is a list and description of the local, express and commuter bus routes of the Maryland Transit Administration, which serve Baltimore and the surrounding suburban areas as of June 2017 following the Baltimore Link Launch.

Routes marked with an asterisk (*) run at all times (24/7/365).

CityLink

Express BusLink 

 Express Bus Link 103: Cromwell Bridge Park & Ride to Inner Harbor (Am & Pm Reverse Commute trips)
 Express Bus Link 105: Cedonia to Lexington Market Metro
 Express Bus Link 115: Perry Hall to Lexington Market Metro / North Ave (Am & Pm Reverse Commute trips)
 Express Bus Link 120: White Marsh Park & Ride to Charles Center and Johns Hopkins Hospital
 Express Bus Link 150: Columbia to Harbor East
 Express Bus Link 154: State Center Metro to Carney / Hillendale (Goucher Blvd & Taylor Ave)
 Express Bus Link 160: Charles Center and Johns Hopkins Hospital to Essex/Whispering Woods
 Express Bus Link 163: Tradepoint Atlantic to West Baltimore Marc

Former Express BusLink Routes

 Express Bus Link 102: White Marsh Park and Ride to Towson
 Express Bus Link 104: Cromwell Bridge Park & Ride to Harbor East
 Express Bus Link 106: Owings Mills Metro to Towson
 Express Bus Link 107: Old Court Station to BWI Marshal Airport / BWI Business Park

LocalLink 

 No. 21 Woodberry Light Rail Station to Canton
 No. 22 Bayview to Mondawmin Metro Station
 No. 26 Patapsco LR to Mondawmin
 No. 28 Moravia to Rogers Metro Station
 No. 29 Mondawmin Metro Station/via Violetville to Brooklyn Homes/ via Violetville 
 No. 30 Rogers Ave Metro Station to Hollander Ridge (Rosedale)
 No. 31 Sinai Hospital to Security Square Mall/CMS/Social Security via Rogers Ave Metro
 No. 32 Patapsco Light Rail to UMBC
 No. 33 Overlea to Mt. Washington
 No. 34 Falls Rd Light Rail Station/Greenspring Station to Westview Mall
 No. 36 Essex (Fox Ridge) to Towson
 No. 37 Old Court Metro to UMBC
 No. 38 Westgate to Medfield
 No. 51 Towson to Downtown (Inner Harbor)
 No. 52 Stella Maris to Greenmount North
 No. 53 Sheppard Pratt/Cromwell Bridge Park & Ride to State Center Metro
 No. 54* Hillendale (Goucher Blvd & Taylor Ave)/Carney Park & Ride to State Center Metro
 No. 56 White Marsh Park & Ride to Downtown (Fayette Plaza)
 No. 57 Belair-Edison Shuttle
 No. 59 Whispering Woods to Moravia via Bayview
 No. 62 CCBC Essex to Turner Station
 No. 63 Gardenville/Hopkins Bayview to Tradepoint Atlantic
 No. 65 Downtown (Fayette Plaza) to CCBC Dundalk/Dundalk Marine Terminal 
 No. 67 City Hall to Marley Neck
 No. 69 Jumpers Hole to Patapsco Light Rail Station/UM Medical Center
 No. 70 Annapolis to Patapsco Light Rail Station/UM Medical Center
 No. 71 Patapsco to Lexington Market via Cherry Hill
 No. 73 Patapsco to State Center via Greyhound
 No. 75* Parkway Center / Arundel Mills to Patapsco Light Rail Station/UM Medical Center
 No. 76 Downtown (City Hall) to UMBC & CCBC Catonsville
 No. 77 Catonsville (Rt. 40 & Rolling Road) to West Baltimore MARC
 No. 78 CMS to City Hall
 No. 79 CMS to Mondawmin Metro Station
 No. 80* City Hall to Rogers Ave Metro
 No. 81 Deer Park Plaza to Millford Mill Metro Station
 No. 82 Reisterstown Plaza Metro Station to Park Circle (Monte Verde)
 No. 83 Old Court Metro Station to Mondawmin Metro Station
 No. 85 Milford Mill Metro Station to Penn-North Metro Station
 No. 87 Glyndon to Owings Mills Metro Station
 No. 89 Red Run Blvd / Owings Mills Metro Station to Rogers Ave Metro Station
 No. 91 Mondawmin Metro Station to Sinai Hospital
 No. 92 Glen & Key to Owings Mills Center
 No. 93 Hunt Valley (International Circle) to Towson via Lutherville Light Rail
 No. 94 Fort McHenry to Sinai Hospital
 No. 95 Inner Harbor to Roland Park

The following is a list and description of the local, express and commuter bus routes of the Maryland Transit Administration, which serve Baltimore and the surrounding suburban areas.

Note: (Crosstown) = Bus service that is traveling across the city of Baltimore without going through the downtown area.

Local routes prior to June 2017
See History of MTA Maryland#Local routes prior to June 2017

Neighborhood Shuttle Bus routes prior to June 2017
See History of MTA Maryland#Neighborhood Shuttle Bus routes prior to June 2017

Shuttle and Circulator routes prior to June 2017
See History of MTA Maryland#Shuttle and Circulator routes prior to June 2017

School Supplementary routes prior to June 2017
See History of MTA Maryland#School Supplementary routes prior to June 2017

Local Express routes prior to June 2017
See History of MTA Maryland#Local Express routes prior to June 2017

QuickBus routes prior to June 2017
See History of MTA Maryland#QuickBus routes prior to June 2017

Express routes prior to June 2017
See History of MTA Maryland#Express routes prior to June 2017

Intercounty Connector Bus routes

Commuter bus routes

Former bus routes
See History of MTA Maryland#Former bus routes

References

External links
 MTA Maryland

Transportation in Baltimore
Maryland
 
Bus routes, MTA